Acantoplistus acutus is an insect species from the family Gryllidae (crickets). The species name for this type of cricket was validly published for the first time in 1877 by Henri Louis Frédéric de Saussure.

References

Gryllinae
Taxa named by Henri Louis Frédéric de Saussure
Insects described in 1877

Acanthoplistus is a genus of crickets in the tribe Gryllini; species are recorded from west Africa, with a discontinuous presence in India and Indo-China